WVVA (channel 6) is a television station licensed to Bluefield, West Virginia, United States, serving the Bluefield–Beckley–Oak Hill market as an affiliate of NBC and The CW Plus. Owned by Gray Television, the station maintains studios on U.S. Route 460 in Bluefield, West Virginia, and its transmitter is located atop East River Mountain, near the West Virginia–Virginia border.

History 
The station went on the air on July 31, 1955, as WHIS-TV. It was named in honor of longtime West Virginia politician Hugh Ike Shott, who had died two years earlier. It was owned by the Shott family's Daily Telegraph Publishing Company, which owned the Bluefield Daily Telegraph along with WHIS radio (1440 AM and 98.7 FM, now WHAJ). Channel 6 signed on under the special commitment of a VHF allotment to Bluefield after the release of the Federal Communications Commission (FCC)'s Sixth Report and Order in 1952. Because of its proposed antenna height and location on East River Mountain, the channel 6 allocation in Bluefield was short-spaced to WATE-TV (also on channel 6) in Knoxville, Tennessee, and side-spaced to WCYB-TV (on adjacent channel 5) in Bristol, Virginia. As a result, the proposed station on the channel 6 frequency would therefore be limited to one-half of the visual maximum effective radiated power for analog channels 2 through 6, or 50,000 watts.

Unable to obtain a network feed, the Shotts were forced to construct a privately owned microwave relay system to receive NBC programming from WSLS-TV in Roanoke, Virginia, the closest and most accessible city receiving network signals via the AT&T Long Lines system. When it was completed in September WHIS-TV began carrying NBC programs, the first being The Pinky Lee Show. The station's operations were originally housed in the Bluefield Municipal Building; on January 1, 1967, the WHIS stations moved into new facilities on Big Laurel Highway (US 19–460), known as "Broadcast Center," and channel 6 began full color operations.

For a long time, the WHIS stations were the only broadcasting outlets in Bluefield. Although the Shotts' media holdings were considered a monopoly by some (as highlighted in a July 1974 Wall Street Journal article), only the newspaper was a vehicle for their conservative political views. But in 1975, the FCC decreed that a single company could not own all of the media outlets in one area, and required several small-market broadcast-print combinations to be broken up by 1980. The Shotts opted to keep the Daily Telegraph and the radio stations and sell channel 6. In 1979, after four years of appeals, the Shotts sold WHIS-TV to Quincy, Illinois–based Quincy Newspapers. After the sale was completed, the new owners changed the station's call letters to WVVA (so as to comply with an FCC rule in effect at the time that required TV and radio stations in the same market, but with different ownership to use different call letters) on May 1, 1979; the call letters refer to the states that channel 6 serves, West Virginia and Virginia.

On February 17, 2009, WVVA switched to "Digital Nightlight" service on its analog signal showing information on the transition to exclusive digital television and its nightly 6 o'clock newscast. Post-transition digital operations continued on channel 46, remapping to virtual channel 6. The station's analog service was terminated altogether in late-April 2009.

On February 1, 2021, Gray Television announced its intent to purchase Quincy Media for $925 million. The acquisition was completed on August 2, making WVVA sister to Gray stations in nearby markets, including CBS affiliates WDBJ in Roanoke and WDTV in Clarksburg, ABC affiliate WHSV-TV in Harrisonburg and fellow NBC affiliates WSAZ-TV in Huntington–Charleston, WTAP-TV in Parkersburg and WVIR-TV in Charlottesville. This leaves the Wheeling–Steubenville market and the portions of the Washington, D.C. and Pittsburgh markets that extend into West Virginia as the only parts of the state not covered by a Gray station (though Washington houses a national political bureau for Gray).

WVVA-DT2 
From 1995 until late 1998, The WB's programming was available in the Beckley–Bluefield–Oak Hill market via WGN-TV's national feed. The station launched in late-1998 as a cable-only station with the fictional call sign "WBB". It was a WB affiliate through The WB 100+ which was a similar operation to the current CW Plus service. "WBB" was identified on-air as "West Virginia's WB 18" (based on its channel location on cable). WVVA provided promotional and advertising services for this station. On January 24, 2006, it was announced that The WB and UPN would end broadcasting and merge to form a new combined service, which would be called The CW. The letters would represent the first initial of corporate parents CBS (the parent company of UPN) and the Warner Bros. unit of Time Warner.

When The CW launched on September 18, "WBB" was added to a new second digital subchannel of WVVA to offer non-cable subscribers access to the network. At this point, it began using the WVVA-DT2 calls in an official manner. For a few weeks during the summer of 2007, WVVA produced a weeknight prime time newscast at 10 on WVVA-DT2. Airing for thirty minutes, the show featured news anchor Erica Greenway (no longer with station), chief meteorologist Corey Henderson, and sports director P. J. Ziegler (now with WJW in Cleveland). It is unknown why the program was dropped after such a short run.

Newscasts 
WVVA remains one of the strongest NBC affiliates in the country and continually averages high Nielsen rating shares in the mountainous nine county market. WVVA News began broadcasting in High Definition from a totally renovated studio with new sets as well as a new control room in June, 2012. In addition to its main studios, WVVA operates a Beckley Bureau (on Main Street along North Kanawha Street/WV 210) and a "virtual" Greenbrier Valley Bureau (covering Summers, Monroe, and Greenbrier counties in West Virginia as well as Giles County, Virginia).

Technical information

Subchannels 
The station's digital signal is multiplexed:

WVVA currently has a construction permit for a digital fill-in translator on channel 43 from a transmitter near Layland. This will have the same call sign as the main signal and primarily serve the northern portion of the market.

See also 
Channel 6 virtual TV stations in the United States
Channel 17 digital TV stations in the United States

References

External links 
 WVVA website
 WHIS-TV/WVVA history
 WVVA-DT2 "Two Virginias' CW"

NBC network affiliates
MeTV affiliates
Court TV affiliates
The CW affiliates
Start TV affiliates
Gray Television
VVA
Television channels and stations established in 1955
1955 establishments in West Virginia
Bluefield, West Virginia